Jhonny Haikella Hakaye (born 8 March 1958 in Ondudu, Omusati Region) is a Namibian politician. A member of the South West Africa People's Organization (SWAPO), Hakaye was first elected to the National Council in 1993. He is the Chief Whip for SWAPO in the National Council.

Education and career
Hakaye graduated from Outapi Senior Secondary School in Omusati Region in 1976. Following graduation, he fled into exile to join SWAPO in Lubango, Angola, becoming a Chief Political Commissar for SWAPO's People's Liberation Army of Namibia from 1977 to 1980. Leaving Lubango in 1980, Hakaye moved to Lusaka to study at the United Nations Institute for Namibia. In Zambia, Hakaye graduated with a diploma from UNIN in 1983 and became an administrator and youth leader at SWAPO's health center in Nyango. A year later, Hakaye left Zambia for Tashkent, Uzbekistan (then part of the Soviet Union), where he studied youth leadership and international relations at a local high school. Leaving the USSR in 1985, he returned to Africa to become the SWAPO's Youth League representative for Eastern, Central and Southern Africa, which lasted until after independence in 1991. The Omusati native was elected regional councillor for Okalongo Constituency, Omusati and later to the National Council for Omusati in 1993.

References

1958 births
Living people
Members of the National Council (Namibia)
People from Omusati Region
Namibian expatriates in Zambia
Namibian expatriates in Angola
Namibian exiles
SWAPO politicians